Spencer McLaren (born 28 February 1973, Sydney) is an Australian theatre actor and television actor.  The 1999 NIDA graduate is most well known for his starring role on the Australian television drama, The Secret Life of Us, as Richie Blake; a role he played for 66 episodes during the show's first 3 series.

Career

Theatre
Australian productions of:
 Kismet
 Cats
 West Side Story
 Beauty and the Beast (1995–1996)
 Call Me Madam (2001)
 Footloose (lead role Ren McCormack) (2003)
 Bye Bye Birdie (lead role Conrad Birdie) (2003–2004)
 Strange Bedfellows (2010) Producer

Television
McLaren has also had roles on other popular Australian programmes such as Blue Heelers, Home and Away as Kieran Fletcher and McLeod's Daughters. He also appeared as himself on popular Australian comedy, Rove Live.

McLaren has made several guest appearances, including the 2005 Doctor Who audio adventure Scaredy Cat and also had a recurrent role as gay backpacker Brett Owen in British soap opera Family Affairs that year.  In 2008, he made a guest appearance in All Saints. In 2016 he appeared in a TV adaption of John Marsden's Tomorrow When The War Began. This aired on ABC3.

Personal life
McLaren is openly gay. He married his partner of five years, Chris Wright in a commitment ceremony on 15 February 2014 at St Kilda Botanical Gardens, Melbourne.

References

External links 
 

1973 births
Living people
Male actors from Sydney
Australian male television actors
Australian gay actors